The athletics competition at the 1951 Summer International University Sports Week was held at the Municipal Stadium in Luxembourg, Luxembourg, between 19 and 26 August.

Medal summary

Men

Women

Medal table

References
World Student Games (Pre-Universiade) - GBR Athletics 

Athletics at the Summer Universiade
1951 Summer International University Sports Week
Uni
Athletics competitions in Luxembourg